A push pin is a short nail or pin with a long, cylindrical head made of plastic. 

Push pin may also refer to:

 Push-pin (game), an English child's game
 Push Pin Studios, a graphic design studio